William Andrew Metzig (December 4, 1918 – March 12, 2006) was a second baseman in Major League Baseball. He played for the Chicago White Sox.

References

External links

1918 births
2006 deaths
Major League Baseball second basemen
Chicago White Sox players
Minor league baseball managers
Baseball players from Iowa
Sportspeople from Fort Dodge, Iowa
American expatriate baseball players in Canada
Clovis Pioneers players
Fond du Lac Panthers players
Joplin Miners players
Little Rock Travelers players
Lubbock Hubbers players
Ottawa Giants players
Ottawa Nationals players
Ottawa Senators (baseball) players
Sherbrooke Athletics players